Tristine Skyler (born July 27, 1971) is an American writer, producer and actress. Born and raised in New York City, Skyler graduated cum laude from Princeton University.

Early life and education
Skyler was born and raised in New York City, where she began her career as an actress, appearing in films, television, as well as in the theatre. She is the sister of Edward Skyler, former Deputy Mayor of Operations for Mayor Michael R. Bloomberg, the youngest in city history, who is now EVP of Global Affairs for Citigroup. She attended Chapin School and Princeton University, graduating cum laude with a B.A. in English.

Career
Skyler is the author of the play The Moonlight Room, about at-risk youth in New York City, which she co-produced at the TriBeCa Playhouse in 2003 before transferring to a commercial run Off-Broadway on Theater Row. It was named one of the 'Ten Best Plays of the Year' by The New York Times and The New York Post, and has since been performed all over the country.  Previously she co-wrote the feature film "Getting to Know You," directed by her sister, Lisanne Skyler, and adapted from short stories by Joyce Carol Oates. The film starred Zach Braff, and Bebe Neuwirth and premiered in the Dramatic Competition at the Sundance Film Festival, the 'Critics Week' section of the Venice Film Festivals, and received "Two Thumbs Up" from Ebert and Roeper.

In 2005, the actress Julia Stiles hired her to adapt Sylvia Plath's iconic novel The Bell Jar for the screen. Her screenplay won the support of the top Plath scholars in the world, and she was asked to participate in Plath's induction into the American Poets' Corner at St. John's Cathedral in New York City. She was later included as an expert in the BBC documentary Inside the Bell Jar which aired in August 2018. During that same period, she found Robert Kanigel's acclaimed biography The Man Who Knew Infinity and originated and executive produced the film adaptation with the writer/director. The Man Who Knew Infinity tells the story of the self-taught Indian math genius Srinivasa Ramanujan, whose work is considered the foundation of the digital age. The film, starring Dev Patel and Jeremy Irons, made its world premiere at the 2015 Toronto International Film Festival and was distributed in the US and globally in 2016. It was screened at the White House by the Office of Science and Technology as part of an initiative on media representation of STEM fields in October 2016, and featured in the Breakthrough Prize ceremony in November 2016. The film also launched a worldwide annual scholarship competition for gifted young mathematicians.

In 2015 it was announced that Skyler had co-written with Scarlett Johansson, who will also direct, an adaptation of Truman Capote's lost novella Summer Crossing which was rediscovered and published in 2005. She has received public readings of two new plays, "Fight or Flight" produced by MCC Theatre starring Sebastian Stan and Aaron Tveit, and in July 2022 "To the Lookout House" starring Tavi Gevinson and Jeremy Bobb.

Personal life
Skyler is a founding committee member of the Kristen Ann Carr Fund, the first charity dedicated to sarcoma research, and is a board member for the non-profit organizations Solar Responders, and Smartspaces.

Filmography

Television

References

External links

1971 births
Living people
American film actresses
Actresses from New York City
Princeton University alumni
21st-century American dramatists and playwrights
Screenwriters from New York (state)
Chapin School (Manhattan) alumni
21st-century American screenwriters
21st-century American actresses